The Kaman K-225 is an American experimental helicopter developed by Kaman Aircraft. One example was modified to become the world's first gas turbine-powered helicopter.

Design and development
The K-125 was Charles Kaman's first helicopter, which utilized intermeshing rotors and Kaman's patented servo-flap stability control. The K-125 first flew on 15 January 1947.

The K-190 and K-225 were an improved versions of the K-125, which first flew in April and July 1949 respectively. The U.S. Navy bought two and the Coast Guard one for $25,000 each. The United States Air Force evaluated one K-225 with the designation YH-22.

A modified K-225 equipped with a Boeing 502 (YT50) turboshaft engine became the first gas turbine-powered helicopter in December 1951. This aircraft is now at the Smithsonian Institution in Washington, D.C.

A standard K-225 is preserved in the New England Air Museum at Windsor Locks Connecticut.

In 1953, the Turkish Army purchased one Kaman K-225 helicopter and a K-225 was the first helicopter flown in Turkey.

Variants

K-125  first two-seat prototype with  Lycoming O-390-3 engine and moulded plywood fuselage and bubble canopy.
K-190  improved prototype with  Lycoming engine, certified in April 1949
K-190A open frame three-seat helicopter, powered by a  Lycoming O-435-C engine. Type certified on April 15, 1949.
K-190B four-seat version.
K-225  improved model, powered by a  Lycoming O-435-A2 engine, certified on September 16, 1949.
K-5    designation for K-225 with Boeing T50-BO-2 model 502 engine.
YH-22  United States Air Force designation for one K-225 bought for evaluation.

Specifications (K-225)

See also

References

Notes

Bibliography
 

1940s United States helicopters
K-225
1940s United States experimental aircraft
Synchropters
Single-engined piston helicopters
Aircraft first flown in 1947